The Wolseley River is a river in Sudbury District and Nipissing District in Northeastern Ontario, Canada. The river begins at an unnamed lake in geographic Servos Township in the Unorganized North Part of Sudbury District, passes through the municipality of French River, then flows about  through the municipality of West Nipissing in Nipissing District to Wolseley Bay on the French River adjacent to the community of Wolseley Bay (also part of the municipality of French River, Sudbury District).

Tributaries
Wolf River (right)

See also
List of rivers of Ontario

References

Sources

Rivers of Nipissing District
Rivers of Sudbury District